Guaifer (also Waifer, Waifar, or Gaideris) was the prince of Benevento from 878, the death of his uncle Adelchis, to his own death a short three years later, in 881. Guaifer was the son of Radelgar, but he was too young to succeed on his father's death in 854 and so had to await the death of his uncle first.

In 879, during the contest over the throne of Capua and its diocese, he came to the aid of Pandenulf against his own brother-in-law, Lando III.

881 deaths
Lombard warriors
People from Benevento
Princes of Benevento
9th-century rulers in Europe
9th-century Lombard people
Year of birth unknown